Nguyen Quoc Y, also known as Master Y (born in 1966) is a famous chef, vice president of the Vietnam Chef Association, the head of culinary training of the tourism training association of Viet Nam. Graduate United Business Institutes (Belgium), he is the leader, researcher and expert training cuisine in Vietnam. He is also the founder of Netspace Culinary Arts School.

References

1966 births
Living people
Vietnamese chefs